Molass may be:
the older name of Holy Island, Firth of Clyde, an island in Scotland
a rare American English term for molasses
 an old word for a type of liquor made from molasses

See also 
 Molasse, a type of rock deposit
 Molas (disambiguation)
 Mollas (disambiguation)